Tephrosia odorata is a species of plant in the family Fabaceae. It is found only in Yemen. Its natural habitat is subtropical or tropical dry lowland grassland.

References

odorata
Endemic flora of Socotra
Least concern plants
Taxonomy articles created by Polbot
Taxa named by Isaac Bayley Balfour